New Zealand humour bears some similarities to the body of humour of many other English-speaking countries. There are, however, several regional differences.

The New Zealand experience 
New Zealand is a country that is isolated from much of the rest of the world geographically, culturally, socially and gastronomically. New Zealanders are predominantly of European ancestry, although there exists a notable number of Asians and Polynesians, including indigenous Māori. It is perhaps not surprising that these two situations lead to a humour that often has as a basis the newcomer trying to assimilate themselves with the new country. The intermingled strands of Māori, British, mainland European, Polynesian, and Asian that have made the country their home each look at the land and each other in a different way, and these differences are often the focal point of humour. Comedians from minority groups (such as Raybon Kan and Jacob Rajan) often use these differences in their routines.

New Zealand's remote and agricultural nature is also a regular comedy catalyst, especially the well-known ratio between people and sheep in the country. The pioneering, backwoods spirit is also commonly used in comedy, as in the stereotypical farmer, Fred Dagg, and the yarns spun by New Zealand writer Barry Crump. Urban/suburban themes were explored by Ginette McDonald with her Lynn of Tawa persona.

The trans-Tasman rivalry 
Australians are the butt of Kiwi humour (and vice versa) — even at the highest diplomatic level. During the 1980s, then–Prime Minister of New Zealand Rob Muldoon was asked about the increasing exodus of New Zealanders leaving the country to work in Australia. His comment was that by doing so, they were raising the average IQ of both countries. The joke derives from the Will Rogers phenomenon.

In general terms, Australians are stereotyped in New Zealand humour as being brash, boorish and lazy. New Zealanders, in return, are seen by Australians as being behind the times and mocked as "South Seas Poms" on account of their supposedly closer ties with Britain ('Pom' is a slang word for 'British person', which is used by New Zealanders and Australians).

Sheep jokes
There are a large number of (mainly crude) sheep jokes. As befitting the trans-Tasman rivalry, Australians tell said jokes about New Zealanders, and New Zealanders tell them about Australians. In the UK on the other hand sheep jokes are usually reserved for the Welsh, or within Scotland in reference to people from Aberdeen.

Some sheep jokes also take differences in the accent into account. In one example, a farmer who is having unnatural relations with a sheep is asked if he should rather be shearing the sheep, to which he replies "I'm not ' s-h-e-a-r-i-n-g ' this sheep with anyone!" Here shearing is taken have the same pronunciation as sharing, as it does in New Zealand English.

Other sheep jokes (or "ewe-phemisms") include puns on song titles which contain the word ewe.  For example, a performing band may announce they are playing the song "There Will Never Be Another You", and follow up by saying that it is particularly bad news for any Australians in the audience.

While other people make jokes about New Zealanders and sheep, New Zealanders themselves are not averse to a bit of sheep humour. In mid-2000, Grant Gillon, then a New Zealand Member of Parliament, caused controversy when he asked the following question during a debate on genetic engineering:

"I want to ask the minister whether, no pun intended, it's appropriate in this case for a woman's body parts to be inserted into a sheep when that has normally been the domain of Tory males?"

Commonly used insults that Australians use are the terms "Sheep-shagger" & "Ram-Rooter".

Accents
The difference between the accents of the two countries is a constant source of amusement. New Zealanders and Australians gain a great deal of enjoyment out of the perceived similarity between the others' pronunciation of the words 'six' and 'sex'.

New Zealanders also often mock Australians by speaking the Australian accent in a stereotypically Steve Irwin fashion.

Australians also often poke fun at New Zealanders' pronunciation of the words "fish and chips" becoming "fush en chups".

Regional humour 
Many regional stereotypes have arisen over the years and jokes are told about other regions based on these stereotypes.

Auckland 
Auckland is New Zealand's largest city and Aucklanders are regarded by many as boorish and insular. Aucklanders are often referred to as JAFAs or "Just Another Fucking Aucklander" and jokes are made about their out-of-touch, soft, city lifestyle and Nouveau riche practices, such as inappropriate use of Pajeros and other 4x4s exclusively on city streets. This tendency is not helped by the perception of Aucklanders not believing that civilization exists south of the Bombay Hills.

During and after the 1998 Auckland power crisis there were many jokes made about it:

 Q: If there are power shortages, which will you keep running, the cappuccino machine or the air conditioner?A: Both.
 Q: What did Aucklanders use before they had candles?A: Electricity.

Wellington 
Wellington, NZ's capital city, is in the Roaring Forties and has geography that intensifies the effects of the prevailing winds leading to its nickname "Windy Wellington". Other New Zealanders making jokes about Wellington concentrate on this aspect.

Wellingtonians make jokes about the wind too, with one example being the Wellington Blown Away sign on the hill by the airport.

As the nation's capital city, political humour is also common. Notable comedy shows with politics as a central theme have included Gliding On, Public Eye, Spin Doctors, and Facelift.

Comedians 
Some of New Zealand's best known comedians spent a large portion of their careers in Australia. This included John Clarke, known to New Zealanders as Fred Dagg, who played the stereotypical farmer with precision and style. His wit later allowed him to extend his repertoire to a series of biting satires, particularly of politicians. He also found an outlet in television series such as The Games and films such as Death in Brunswick.

Other examples include Tony Martin of 1980s sketch show, The D-Generation fame. Three compilations of the Australian national radio program Martin/Molloy earned him ARIA awards. He has also written and directed the movie Bad Eggs.

Pamela Stephenson was born in New Zealand, made her name in Australia, went to Britain and starred in the sketch comedy Not the Nine O'Clock News and currently lives in America with her husband Billy Connolly.

However it was Billy T James who was to dominate New Zealand comedy through the 1980s.  His first major role being the lead in TVNZ's Radio Times.  James went on to gain his own self-titled show.  Loved and hated for his irreverent portrayal of Maori, his characters, along with John Clarke's Fred Dagg were, until very recently, to set the benchmark for New Zealand comedy.

Alan Brough appeared on Spicks and Specks as a writer and team captain. In 2004 he was one third of the radio show Tough Love with Mick Molloy. He has also appeared in several movies such as Bad Eggs

For several years during the 1970s and 1980s, New Zealand television featured a satirical send-up of current affairs entitled A Week of It. This series, and particularly its two main stars, David McPhail and Jon Gadsby, became for several years a mainstay of New Zealand comedy.

One of New Zealand film director Peter Jackson's first films was Meet the Feebles, a riotous sexual puppet romp.

Some more recent New Zealand comedians worthy of mention are:
Rhys Darby, stand-up comedian most notorious for his portrayal of Flight of the Conchords manager 'Murray'.
Raybon Kan, former journalist and lawyer turned comedian.
Cal Wilson, appearing on Thank God You're Here several times and performing at the Melbourne International Comedy Festival numerous times. Her career in Australia extended to a regular drive-time radio show and weekly coverage of Australian Idol.
Bret McKenzie and Jemaine Clement form the partnership Flight of the Conchords, their work including the HBO television series, which followed "the trials and tribulations of a two-man, digi-folk band from New Zealand as they try to make a name for themselves in their adopted home of New York City".
Taika Waititi (also known as Taika Cohen), Academy Award nominated film director and stand-up comedian.
Jarred Christmas is an ex-pat New Zealand comic, who makes his living in the United Kingdom. He does much work with the BBC, and won the Chortle comedy award for Best Compere.
Madeleine Sami is a Fijian Indian/Irish comedian from Auckland. She is best known for the TV series Super City and performing in the play No2.
Topp Twins

Comedy films 
Goodbye Pork Pie (1981)
Tally Ho
Came a Hot Friday (1985)
Bad Taste (1987)
Meet the Feebles (1989)
Old Scores (1991)
Forgotten Silver (1995)
The Price of Milk (2000)
Scarfies (2001)
Stickmen (2001)
Tongan Ninja (2002)
Sione's Wedding (2006)
Black Sheep (2006)
The Devil Dared Me To (2007)
Men Shouldn't Sing (2007)
Eagle vs Shark (2007)
Boy (2010)
Sione's 2: Unfinished Business (2012)
Two Little Boys (2012)
What We Do in the Shadows (2014)
Hunt for the Wilderpeople (2016)
The Breaker Upperers (2018)

Cartoons
Footrot Flats
Stanley
Bogor
Antics

Comedy television 

7 Days
A Week of It
Back of the Y
Best Bits
The Billy T James Show
Bro'Town
Eating Media Lunch
Facelift
Flight of the Conchords
Funny Girls
Glide Time
Hounds

Jono and Ben (formerly Jono and Ben at Ten)
The Jono Project
Moon TV
Outrageous Fortune
The Pretender
Pulp Sport
Serial Killers
Seven Periods with Mr Gormsby
Super City
Wanna-Ben
Wellington Paranormal

See also

References